Pseudogaurotina is a genus of beetles in the family Cerambycidae, containing the following species:

 Pseudogaurotina abdominalis (Bland, 1862)
 Pseudogaurotina cressoni (Bland, 1864)
 Pseudogaurotina excellens (Brancsik, 1874)
 Pseudogaurotina magnifica Plavilstshikov, 1958
 Pseudogaurotina robertae Pesarini & Sabbadini, 1997
 Pseudogaurotina splendens (Jakovlev, 1893)

References

Lepturinae